Acacia sulcaticaulis, also commonly known as the Mount Mulgine fluted wattle, is a shrub or tree belonging to the genus Acacia and the subgenus Juliflorae that is native to a small area in western Australia.

Description
It has longitudinally fluted branches and stems with smooth bark and glabrous and resinous new shoots. The glabrous branchlets become flattened toward the terminus of the branches and are flattened and obscurely ribbed. 

Like most species of Acacia it has phyllodes instead of true leaves.

The simple inflorescences occur singly or in pairs in the axils.

Distribution
It is native to a small area in the Wheatbelt region of Western Australia around Perenjori in the Mount Mulgine area. It is often found on ridges, steep slopes and along rocky creek lines in gravelly sandy soils over quartz substrates as a part of shrubland commonunites where it is often associated with Acacia burkittii and Allocasuarina acutivalvis.

See also
 List of Acacia species

References

sulcaticaulis
Acacias of Western Australia
Taxa named by Bruce Maslin
Plants described in 2008